Tim van Rijthoven (born 24 April 1997) is a Dutch professional tennis player.

Van Rijthoven has a career-high ATP singles ranking of world No. 101, which he first achieved on 18 July 2022, and a career-high doubles ranking of world No. 225, attained in May 2022. As a junior, he reached a high of world No. 13 in 2015 and reached the quarterfinals of the 2014 Wimbledon Championships boys' singles tournament and semifinals of the boys' doubles. In June 2022, he claimed his first five ATP Tour wins (including over world No. 2 Daniil Medvedev) en route to his maiden Rosmalen Grass Court Championships title.

Van Rijthoven has represented Netherlands at the Davis Cup where he has a W/L record of 1–1. He has won 13 Futures tournaments on the ITF World Tennis Tour, including eight singles titles and five doubles titles.

Professional career

2016: ATP debut and top 300
In 2016 he made his debut on the ATP World Tour by qualifying as a lucky loser for the Winston-Salem Open after Thanasi Kokkinakis withdrew due to a recurring shoulder injury, where he lost to Jiří Veselý in the first round. Van Rijthoven described the match as "a great experience".

2022: Maiden ATP title with win over World No. 2, Major debut and fourth round, top 125
He made his top 250 debut in doubles on 17 January 2022 after a quarterfinal in Challenger in Traralgon, Australia partnering with Nino Serdarušić. He made his top 200 debut in singles on 21 February 2022 after reaching his second singles Challenger final as a qualifier in Forli, Italy. At the same tournament, seeded third, he reached the quarterfinals in doubles with Robin Haase and improved his doubles ranking to No. 235.

Ranked No. 205 on his debut at the 2022 Libéma Open as a wildcard, he defeated Matthew Ebden and world No. 14 and third seed Taylor Fritz to reach the quarterfinals for the first time in his career. Next, he beat Hugo Gaston in straight sets to reach his first semifinal. There, he won against a top 10 player for the first time in his career by upsetting world No. 9 and second seed Félix Auger-Aliassime in the semifinals. Van Rijthoven pulled off another upset by defeating world no. 2 and top seed Daniil Medvedev in straight sets in the final, becoming the lowest ranked player to win an ATP title in 2022, the lowest-ranked player to win a title since the 335th-ranked Juan Manuel Cerúndolo in 2021 Córdoba and the first Dutchman to win the ATP 250 event since Sjeng Schalken in 2003. He moved to just outside the top 100 at World No. 106 on 13 June 2022 climbing 99 positions up in the rankings.

As a result of his title run, van Rijthoven received a wildcard into Wimbledon where he made his Grand Slam debut. On his Major debut he won his first Grand Slam match at Wimbledon in three straight sets defeating Federico Delbonis. In the second round he defeated 15th seed Reilly Opelka, then in the third round, he defeated 22nd seed Nikoloz Basilashvili to advance to the fourth round of a major on his debut, becoming the seventh ATP player to achieve that feat since 2000 and only the third player in the past two years to do so after Aslan Karatsev and Lorenzo Musetti, as well as the first wildcard since Nick Kyrgios to reach the fourth round of Wimbledon. In the round of 16, he lost to the top seed and eventual champion, Novak Djokovic in four sets.

Due to a back injury sustained in Indianapolis, van Rijthoven did not play any tournaments until his debut at the US Open. He beat qualifier Zhang Zhizhen in the first round, saving 7 match points in the third set. He was beaten by 5th seed and eventual runner up, Casper Ruud, in the second round.

Singles performance timeline

Current through the 2022 Hall of Fame Open.

ATP career finals

Singles: 1 (1 title)

ATP Challenger and ITF Futures/World Tennis Tour finals

Singles: 15 (8–7)

Record against other players

Record against top-10 players
Van Rijthoven's record against players who have been ranked in the top 10, with those who are active in boldface. Only ATP Tour main draw matches are considered:

Record against players ranked No. 11–20

Active players are in boldface. 

  Reilly Opelka 1–0
  Nikoloz Basilashvili 1–0

*

Wins over top-10 players
He has a  record against players who were, at the time the match was played, ranked in the top 10.

*

References

External links
 
 
 

1997 births
Living people
Dutch male tennis players
Sportspeople from Roosendaal
21st-century Dutch people